Lampropeltis rhombomaculata, commonly known as the mole kingsnake or the brown kingsnake, is a species of snake in the family Colubridae. It is a relatively medium-sized snake that occupies a variety of habitats from Baltimore, Maryland, south through the Florida Panhandle and west into Mississippi and Tennessee.

Geographic range
The mole kingsnake is found in the southeastern United States, but is absent from the Appalachian Mountains.

Description 
L. rhombomaculata is generally light brown or gray in color, with dark brown, orange, or reddish-brown blotching down the length of its body. It is capable of growing to a total length (including tail) of 30–40 inches (76.2–101.6 cm). It is easily mistaken for the milk snake and the venomous copperhead, which both share the same type of habitat, and can have similar markings. Some specimens have their markings faded, to appear almost a solid brown color. Juveniles are generally more vivid in markings and coloration, with small reddish-colored markings on the head.

Habitat and behavior
The preferred habitat of the mole kingsnake is open fields with loose, dry soil, typically on the edge of a forested region. Its diet consists primarily of rodents, but it will also consume lizards, frogs and occasionally other snakes. It is nonvenomous, and typically docile. Like most colubrids, if harassed it will vibrate its tail rapidly. This snake is very secretive and very fossorial and rarely seen above ground during the day unless it is forced out by heavy rains. The mole kingsnake is mainly nocturnal and commonly seen on paved roads at night.

This species has been observed to ingest prey whole and headfirst, even prey with a diameter over 90% of the diameter of the snake's head. This is thought to be an inherited behavior.

Reproduction 
Male and female mole kingsnakes mate around May–June during late spring to early summer. Females leave behind pheromone trails for males to sense through their forked tongues. After mating, females choose their nesting sites underground or in rotting logs and leave their 10-12 eggs to hatch in the summer. The mother does not stay behind to nurture her offspring, usually leaving right after she laid the eggs. It takes about ten days for the hatched snakes to be fully independent.

The hatchlings and eggs of L. rhombomaculata are both of smaller average size than those of L. calligaster.

References

Further reading
Holbrook JE (1840). North American Herpetology; or, a Description of the Reptiles Inhabiting the United States. Volume IV. [First Edition]. Philadelphia: J. Dobson. 126 pp. + Plates I–XXVIII. (Coluber rhombo-maculatus, new species, pp. 103–104 + Plate XX).

External links
Florida Museum of Natural History: Lampropeltis calligaster rhombomaculata
Herps of North Carolina: Mole Kingsnake

rhombomaculata
Fauna of the Eastern United States
Fauna of the Southeastern United States